Bill Evans is an album by Paul Motian on the German JMT label. It was released in 1990 and features nine compositions by pianist Bill Evans (Motian’s former employer) performed by Motian with guitarist Bill Frisell, tenor saxophonist  Joe Lovano and bassist Marc Johnson. The album was reissued in 2002 on the Winter & Winter label.

Reception
The Allmusic review by Stephen Cook awarded the album 4½ stars, stating: "This is one of the best releases of the handful Motian has done with Lovano and Frisell, and certainly as fine a tribute record as there is. A good purchase for fans of both Bill Evans and Paul Motian".

Track listing
All compositions by Bill Evans
 "Show-Type Tune" - 6:16  
 "Turn Out the Stars" - 7:14  
 "Walkin' Up" - 5:39  
 "Very Early" - 5:55  
 "Five" - 3:34  
 "Time Remembered" - 7:28  
 "Skidoo" - 8:16  
 "Re: Person I Knew" - 7:14  
 "Children's Play Song" - 4:18  
Recorded May 1990 at A&R Recording Studios, NYC

Personnel
Paul Motian – drums
Bill Frisell – electric guitar
Joe Lovano – tenor saxophone
Marc Johnson – bass

References

1990 albums
Paul Motian albums
JMT Records albums
Winter & Winter Records albums
Bill Evans tribute albums